Mark Nielsen (born August 25, 1964) is an American business executive, former elected official, and attorney.

Nielsen's current position is Chief Legal and Regulatory Officer of Frontier Communications Corporation (NASDAQ: FYBR), at the company's headquarters in Norwalk, Connecticut. Frontier is America's fourth largest landline telecom company providing data and voice services in 25 states.

Nielsen started his legal career in 1990 as an associate lawyer at the Hartford law firm of Murtha, Cullina, Richter & Pinney, concentrating on federal and state litigation.

Nielsen's public roles have included Republican State Representative in Connecticut (1992 to 1994), Republican State Senator in Connecticut (1994 to 1998), and staff member to Mitt Romney when Romney was Governor of Massachusetts.  Nielsen served as Romney's Chief Legal Counsel from 2004 to 2006, and his Chief of Staff from 2006 to 2007, succeeding Beth Myers in that position.

In his memoir, In My Time, Vice President Dick Cheney acknowledges that he was initially angered by Nielsen’s favorable comments about Cheney's opponent in the 2000 election, Senator Joe Lieberman, but that, upon reflection, he couldn’t disagree with what Nielsen had said about Lieberman.[2]

Nielsen is an honors graduate of Harvard College and Harvard Law School, and currently serves as a member of the Adjunct Faculty at Columbia Law School.  His brother Steven Nielsen is CEO of Dycom Industries, Inc. (NYSE: DY) and his wife Jane Nielsen is COO/CFO of Ralph Lauren Corporation (NYSE: RL).

References

External links 
http://www.cnn.com/ELECTION/1998/states/CT/H/05/mark.nielsen.html
http://www.presidency.ucsb.edu/ws/index.php?pid=95565
The Washington Post
http://www.metrocorpcounsel.com/articles/19910/striving-first-class-corporate-compliance-changing-world
http://www.metrocorpcounsel.com/articles/24426/insider-advice-building-effective-board-processes
http://modern-counsel.com/frontier/

Living people
1961 births
Harvard College alumni
Harvard Law School alumni
Connecticut state senators
Members of the Connecticut House of Representatives
Connecticut lawyers
Chiefs of staff to United States state governors